Shaalinee is a 2000 Maldivian drama film written, produced and directed by Aslam Rasheed. The film stars Mariyam Nisha, Ibrahim Giyas, Mohamed Shavin and Waleedha Waleed in pivotal roles. Shooting for the film took place in Sri Lanka.

Premise
Shavin (Mohamed Shavin) finds a young lady, Shaalinee (Mariyam Nisha) lying on the road unconscious, whom he takes to a clinic and takes full responsibility of her. On regaining her consciousness, Shaalinee flees from the clinic due to the financial incapability to pay the bills. She auditions for the choreographer role under Shavin's newly established firm, but upon seeing her, he instead hired as his personal secretary.

Shaalinee is introduced to Shavin's family and his mother becomes impressed with her virtuous behavior. Meanwhile, he befriends with Shah (Ibrahim Ghiyas) and upon request of Shah, Shavin confesses to Shaalinee. They decide to begin a romantic relationship while concealing their past. However, their journey moves in an unsettling route when Shah discovers that Shavin is to marry his ex-fiancé, Shaalinee.

Cast 
 Mariyam Nisha as Shaalinee
 Ibrahim Giyas as Shah
 Mohamed Shavin as Shavin
 Chilhiya Moosa Manik as Moosa Manik; Shah's father
 Arifa Ibrahim as Arifa; Shah's step-mother
 Waleedha Waleed as Varudha
 Fauziyya Hassan as Shavin's mother
 Ahmed Shah as Jameel
 Mohamed Afrah as Moosa
 Mariyam Rizla as Aisha

Soundtrack

References

Maldivian drama films
2000 films
Films shot in Sri Lanka
2000 drama films
Dhivehi-language films